The Guaramacal National Park Also General Cruz Carrillo National Park Is a protected area with the status of a national park located between the states of Portuguesa and Trujillo in the South American country of Venezuela. It has an area of about 214.66 km² and includes the Guaramacal Branch, the most northerly spur of the Cordillera de Mérida. The limits of the park are between 1600 and 1800 m in height, and the maximum elevation, in the moor of Guaramacal is to 3100 m.

The Guaramacal can be distinguished by a great endemism, highlighted by the presence of species such as the palmera frailejón Ruilopezia paltoniode.

Its flora is still under study and the provisional inventory has about 1,227 species, highlighting an important richness of orchids and ferns, as well as various endemic species of frailejones.

The first floristic studies within the park date from 1987, and mentioned a total of 482 species of plants. A more thorough and systematic study in 2000 yielded a total of 147 families, 517 genera and at least 1227 species, providing descriptions for 33 new taxa for science.

Gallery

See also
List of national parks of Venezuela
Mochima National Park

References

National parks of Venezuela
Protected areas established in 1988
Geography of Lara (state)
Geography of Portuguesa (state)
Tourist attractions in Lara (state)
Tourist attractions in Portuguesa (state)
1988 establishments in Venezuela